Sister Agnes Salome Awuor (Kenya, 1967) is a Kenyan Religious Sister.

Biography
She joined sisterhood in 1986. She got her bachelor's degree from St. Scholastica's College in Manila, Philippines. She is studying her master's degree in Education and Leadership from the Dominican University in Illinois.
In 2012, she decided to leave the convent life to candidate for the Siaya senate seat in the 2013 Kenyan parliamentary election.

See also

References

1967 births
Kenyan Roman Catholic religious sisters and nuns
Kenyan expatriates in the United States
Kenyan politicians
Living people
21st-century Kenyan women politicians
21st-century Kenyan politicians
20th-century Roman Catholic nuns